The Sensei is a 2008 independent feature film, written, produced and directed by Diana Lee Inosanto (credited as D. Lee Inosanto).

Plot summary
Set in Colorado, the story takes place in 1985 during the rise of the AIDS panic.  McClain Evans is a gay high school student, constantly the target of bullying in his town.  Karen O'Neil is a woman haunted by the death of her pro-boxer fiancé, Mark Corey.  After a five-year absence, she returns to her family, who runs a successful martial arts school. When McClain is attacked by three local teens, his mother, Annie, asks Karen to teach her son martial arts so that he can defend himself.  Karen's family is fearful of anti-gay retaliation, so Karen is forced to secretly teach McClain at night.  When word of this reaches her family, and the small-town community, violence erupts, and family and friendship are challenged, forcing Karen to reveal her own dark and tragic secret to those she loves most.

Cast
Diana Lee Inosanto as Karen Nakano O'Neil
Michael O'Laskey as McClain Evans
Brad Thornton as Larry Blackbelt
Keith David as the Minister
Louis Mandylor as Mark Corey
Sab Shimono as Taky Nakano
Emily Kuroda as Flora Nakano
Michael Yama as Yori Nakano
Tim Lounibos as Simon Nakano O'Neil
Tzi Ma as the Buddhist Monk
Mark McGraw as Rick Beard
Jonathan Camp as Craig Beard
Gina Scalzi as Annie Evans
Bryan Frank as Peter O'Neil
Michael Hake as Gary O'Neil
Ron Balicki as Samurai #1 / Sparring Partner Vince

Awards
Best Feature Writer – La Femme International Film Festival
Honorable Mention, Best Feature Film – Philadelphia Asian American Film Festival
Best Screenplay (Feature Film) – Hoboken International Film Festival

References

External links 

The Sensei profiled by Jane Mee Wong in Northwest Asian Weekly (Oct. 2008)

American independent films
American LGBT-related films
Films about Japanese Americans
American martial arts films
Films directed by Diana Lee Inosanto
Films set in Colorado
Films set in the 1980s
HIV/AIDS in American films
2000s English-language films
2000s American films